is a Japanese footballer. He plays for J-Lease FC from 2023.

Career statistics
Updated to the end 2022 season.

1Includes J2/JFL and J2/J3 play-offs.

References

External links
 
 Profile at Kamatamare Sanuki
 

1991 births
Living people
Tokyo Gakugei University alumni
Association football people from Toyama Prefecture
Japanese footballers
J2 League players
J3 League players
Japan Football League players
Kashima Antlers players
FC Machida Zelvia players
Kamatamare Sanuki players
Iwate Grulla Morioka players
Vanraure Hachinohe players
J-Lease FC players
Association football defenders